The 1968 United States Senate elections were elections for the United States Senate. Held on November 5, the 34 seats of Class 3 were contested in regular elections. They coincided with the presidential election of the same year. Although Richard Nixon won the presidential election narrowly, the Republicans picked up five net seats in the Senate. This saw Republicans win a Senate seat in Florida for the first time since Reconstruction.  

Republicans would gain another seat after the election when Alaska Republican Ted Stevens was appointed to replace Democrat Bob Bartlett, reducing Democrats' majority to 57-43.

Results summary 

Source: Clerk of the U.S. House of Representatives

Gains, losses, and holds

Retirements
Three Republicans and three Democrats retired instead of seeking re-election.

Defeats
One Republican and seven Democrats sought re-election but lost in the primary or general election.

Post-election changes
One Democrat died on December 11, 1968, and a Republican was appointed on December 24, 1968.

Change in composition

Before the elections

After the general elections

Beginning of the next Congress

Race summary

Elections leading to the next Congress 
In these general elections, the winners were elected for the term beginning January 3, 1969; ordered by state.

All of the elections involved the Class 3 seats.

Closest races 
Fifteen races had a margin of victory under 10%:

Arkansas was the tipping point state with a margin of 18.3%.

Alabama

Alaska 

Democrat Ernest Gruening lost renomination to fellow Democrat Mike Gravel.  Gruening then ran as an Independent, but lost again to Gravel in the general election, thereby keeping the seat in Democratic hands.

Two months after the election, on December 11, 1968, the other Alaskan senator, Democrat Bob Bartlett, died. Republican Ted Stevens was then appointed to that other seat.

Arizona 

Incumbent Democrat Carl Hayden did not run for re-election to an eighth term, with his long-time staff member Roy Elson running as the Democratic Party nominee to replace him. Elson beat State Treasurer of Arizona Bob Kennedy in the primary.

Elson was defeated by a wide margin, however, by former U.S. senator and Republican Presidential nominee Barry Goldwater. Prior to Goldwater's election, the seat had been held for decades by the Democratic Party under Carl Hayden, and would remain under Republican Party control until 2020. Elson had previously challenged U.S. senator Paul Fannin in 1964, when Goldwater vacated his seat to run for President against Lyndon B. Johnson.

Arkansas

California

Colorado

Connecticut

Florida

Georgia 

Talmadge sought another term to the Senate and was easily re-elected. The election was notable for the Georgia Republican Party, as it marked the first U.S. Senate election where it fielded a candidate. Patton lost by over 50% to Talmadge.

Hawaii

Idaho

Illinois 

Incumbent Republican and Minority Leader Everett Dirksen won re-election to his fourth term over William G. Clark (D), the Illinois Attorney General.

Indiana

Iowa 

Four-term Republican Bourke B. Hickenlooper retired.  Two-term Democratic Governor of Iowa Harold Hughes was elected senator in a close race against Republican state senator David M. Stanley.

Kansas

Kentucky

Louisiana

Maryland

Missouri

Nevada

New Hampshire

New York 

Incumbent Republican Jacob K. Javits won against Democratic challenger Paul O'Dwyer and Conservative Party challenger James L. Buckley in a three-way election.

While Javits did not face any challengers for the Republican nomination, he did face a minor one when seeking the Liberal Party of New York's nomination.

North Carolina 

The general election was fought between the Democratic incumbent Sam Ervin and the Republican nominee Robert Somers.  Ervin won re-election to a third full term, with over 60% of the vote.

The first round of the Primary Election was held on  May 4, 1968. The runoff for the Republican Party candidates took place on June 1.

North Dakota 

North Dakota Republican Milton Young, sought and received re-election to his fifth term, defeating North Dakota Democratic-NPL Party candidate Herschel Lashkowitz, the mayor of Fargo, North Dakota since 1954.

Only Young filed as a Republican, and the endorsed Democratic candidate was Herschel Lashkowitz of Fargo, North Dakota, who was serving as the mayor of the city since 1954. Young and Lashkowitz won the primary elections for their respective parties.

One independent candidate, Duane Mutch of Larimore, North Dakota, also filed before the deadline. Mutch was later a state senator for the North Dakota Republican Party in the North Dakota Senate from 1959 to 2006 for District 19. He ran as an independent when he did not receive his party's nomination.

Ohio

Oklahoma 

Incumbent Democratic U.S. senator Mike Monroney was running for re-election to a fourth term, but was defeated by Republican former Governor Henry Bellmon.

Oregon 

Incumbent Democrat Wayne Morse was seeking a fifth term, but narrowly lost re-election to 36-year-old Republican State Representative Bob Packwood race.

The Democratic primary was held May 28, 1968. Morse defeated former Representative Robert B. Duncan, former U.S. Congressman from Oregon's 4th congressional district (1963–1967), and Phil McAlmond, millionaire and former aide to opponent Robert B. Duncan.

Pennsylvania 

Incumbent Democrat Joseph Clark sought re-election to another term, but was defeated by Republican nominee Richard Schweiker, member of the U.S. House of Representatives.

South Carolina 

Incumbent Democrat Fritz Hollings easily defeated Republican state senator Marshall Parker in a rematch of the election two years earlier, to win his second (his first full) term.

Hollings faced no opposition from South Carolina Democrats, and avoided a primary election. Marshall Parker, the state senator from Oconee County in the Upstate, was persuaded by South Carolina Republicans to enter the race, and he did not face a primary challenge.

After a close election loss to Fritz Hollings in 1966, the Republicans felt that Parker might have a chance at defeating Hollings by riding Nixon's coattails in the general election. However, the Republicans did not provide Parker with the financial resources to compete, and he subsequently lost by a bigger margin to Hollings than two years prior.

South Dakota

Utah

Vermont 

Incumbent Republican George Aiken ran successfully for re-election to another term in the United States Senate; he was unopposed.

Washington

Wisconsin 

Incumbent Democrat Gaylord A. Nelson (U.S. senator since 1963) defeated Republican State Senator Jerris Leonard.

See also
 1968 United States elections
 1968 United States gubernatorial elections
 1968 United States presidential election
 1968 United States House of Representatives elections
 90th United States Congress
 91st United States Congress

Notes

References 
 "Supplemental Report of the Secretary of State to the General Assembly of South Carolina." Reports and Resolutions of South Carolina to the General Assembly of the State of South Carolina. Volume II. Columbia, SC: 1969, p. 19.